Pape is a surname. Notable people with the surname include:

 Albert Pape (1897–1955), English footballer
 Alexander August Wilhelm von Pape (1813–1895), Prussian field marshal
 Andy Pape (born 1962), English footballer
 Arthur Pape (1890–1945), English cricketer
 Bryan Pape, Australian academic
 Burkhard Pape (born 1932), German footballer
 Charles Pape, Belgian Olympic fencer
 Chris Pape, American graffiti artist
 Frank C. Papé (1878–1972), English artist and book illustrator
 Jean-Henri Pape (1787–1875), French piano maker
 George Pape (1903–1987), Australian lawyer and judge
 Gérard Pape (born 1955), American composer
 Günther Pape (1907–1986), German general
 Ken Pape (born 1951), American baseball player
 Larry Pape (1885–1918), American baseball player
 Lorne De Pape (born 1955), Canadian-born New Zealand curler
 Lygia Pape (1927–2004), Brazilian artist
 Madeleine Pape (born 1984), Australian runner
 Maiken Pape (born 1978), Danish footballer
 Oran Pape (1904–1936), American police officer
 Pascal Papé (born 1980), French rugby union footballer
 Paul Pape (born 1952), American actor and voice actor
 Philip Pape (1910-1982), British sculptor
 Ralph Pape, American playwright
 René Pape (born 1964), German operatic bass
 Robert Pape (born 1960), American political scientist
 Scott Pape, Australian radio personality
 Tony Pape (born 1981), American football player
 Wilhelm Pape (1807–1854), German classical philologist and lexicographer

See also
 Pape (disambiguation)